The 1982 Texas Longhorns football team represented the University of Texas at Austin in the 1982 NCAA Division I-A football season.  The Longhorns finished the regular season with a 9–2 record and lost to North Carolina in the Sun Bowl.

Schedule

Season summary

Oklahoma

References

Texas
Texas Longhorns football seasons
Texas Longhorns football